Dohn Norwood is an American actor who has appeared in the television series Hell on Wheels (2011–16). He has starred on The Sinner since 2017.

Personal life

Norwood married Marlene Glasper in 2013.

Filmography

Film

Television

References

External links

Living people
American male film actors
American male television actors
African-American male actors
Male actors from Indianapolis
21st-century American male actors
Year of birth missing (living people)
21st-century African-American people